Meliau Hill is an Mountain located on north side of the Labuk River between Telupid and Pamol in the eastern part of Ulu Tungud Forest Reserve in Telupid District, Sabah, Malaysia. The summit is 1,321 m above sea level.

References

Meliau